Jim Allen (born August 1, 1952) is an American politician from the state of Wyoming. A Republican, Allen was a member of the Wyoming House of Representatives, representing District 33 from 2015 until 2019, following his defeat in the 2018 state elections.

Elections

2004
Allen was appointed to the Wyoming House of Representatives in April 2004 after incumbent Republican Representative Harry B. Tipton died of leukemia.  He then ran for a full term, winning the Republican primary without any opposition. Allen was defeated by Democrat Patrick Goggles in the general election, 56% to 44%.

2012
Allen ran for his former seat, defeating Daniel Cardenas in the Republican primary. He lost to Democratic incumbent Patrick Goggles, 52% to 48%.

2014
After Democratic incumbent Patrick Goggles announced his retirement, Allen announced his candidacy for the seat. He defeated Daniel Cardenas in the Republican primary and defeated Democratic candidate Andrea Clifford in the general election, 53% to 47%.

2016
Allen ran for re-election, and was unopposed in the Republican primary.  He faced Democrat Sergio Maldonado in the general election, and defeated Maldonado with 51% of the vote.

References

External links
Official page at the Wyoming Legislature
Profile from Ballotpedia

1952 births
Living people
Republican Party members of the Wyoming House of Representatives
University of Wyoming alumni
People from Lander, Wyoming
21st-century American politicians